Wormwood:  Writings about fantasy, supernatural and decadent literature is a magazine of literature and literary criticism, edited by Mark Valentine, and published semi-annually since 2003 by Tartarus Press. The first issue appeared in August 2003.

As the subtitle indicates, the magazine focuses on fantasy and decadence, and especially on European authors of the past two centuries. Most of the selections are criticism articles or book reviews, although some previously unpublished fiction has recently appeared. Issues 1-14 featured a column titled "The Decadent World-View" by Brian Stableford, analyzing texts which provided particular influence on the French Decadents, particularly Charles Baudelaire.

See also
List of literary magazines

References

Suzi Feay, "Crowley's Tentacles", The Independent on Sunday, 11 January 2004.
Ian McMillan, "Discover the Darker Side of the Dales", Yorkshire Post, 1 May 2009.

External links
 Wormwood page at Tartarus Press

2003 establishments in the United Kingdom
Biannual magazines published in the United Kingdom
Literary magazines published in the United Kingdom
Magazines established in 2003